Ziyang County is a county in the south of Shaanxi province, China, bordering Chongqing to the southeast and Sichuan to the southwest. It is under the administration of the prefecture-level city of Ankang.

Administrative divisions
As 2019, Ziyang County is divided to 17 towns.
Towns

Climate

Transportation 

 G65 Baotou–Maoming Expressway

References

 
County-level divisions of Shaanxi
Ankang